The 2021 NCAA Men's Water Polo Championship occurred from December 4–5, 2021 in Los Angeles, California at the Spieker Aquatics Center. This was the 53rd NCAA Men's Water Polo Championship. Seven teams participated in this championship. Opening round game-one was played at Princeton University. The UCLA Bruins were the defending national champions and the 2021 Mountain Pacific Sports Federation (MPSF) champions. The rankings before the tournament: No. 1 University of California, No. 2 University of Southern California, No. 3 University of California Los Angeles, No. 4 Stanford University, No. 5 Long Beach State University.

Schedule
All times are Eastern time

Bracket
The championship featured a knockout format where schools that lost were eliminated from the tournament. The championship pairings were announced on Sunday, November 21, 2021 by the NCAA Men’s Water Polo Committee.

Qualification
Top ranked teams from five conferences received automatic qualification (AQ). The conferences are the Golden Coast Conference (GCC), Mid-Atlantic Water Polo Conference (MAWPC), Mountain Pacific Sports Federation (MPSF), Northeast Water Polo Conference (NWPC),  and the Western Water Polo Association (WWPA). The two at-large teams, without geographical restrictions, came from MPSF: UCLA and Southern California.

Teams

All-NCAA Tournament Team

After the championship, the All-NCAA Tournament First and Second teams were announced.

First Team
 Max Casabella (Cal)
 Hannes Daube (USC)
 Jack Deely (Cal)
 Jacob Mercep (USC)
 Ashworth Molthen (USC)
 Nikolaos Papanikolaou (MVP, Cal)
 Adrian Weinberg (Cal)

Second Team
 Nic Porter (USC)
 Nikos Delagrammatikas (Cal)
 Nir Gross (UC Davis)
 Aleix Aznar Beltran (UC Davis)

Awards
 Gabe Discipulo (UCLA) was awarded the Elite 90 Award (highest GPA).

References

2021 in American sports
2021 in water polo
2021 in sports in California
NCAA Men's Water Polo Championship